Saber Rider and the Star Sheriffs is an animated television space Western, similar to the series The Adventures of the Galaxy Rangers and BraveStarr. The series premiered in the United States in 1987 and had a run of 52 episodes.

The English language rights to the series were purchased by World Events Productions (WEP), the same company behind the English-language version of Voltron, in 1986. WEP reorganized and rewrote the series, incorporating most of the original episodes and creating 6 new ones, before releasing it under the name Saber Rider and the Star Sheriffs.

Plot

The series is set in the distant future. Humans have spread beyond living on Earth and have colonized planets across the universe, creating a New Frontier of man. In order to protect these new settlers and maintain law and order in the New Frontier, Earth's Cavalry Command was created. Cavalry Command is a military organization that maintains an army and fleet of ships to protect the New Frontier and the residents of the planets within it known as Settlers. Within Cavalry Command is a unit of special operatives known as Star Sheriffs that function as the organization's field agents, investigating any crimes and plots that threaten the security of the New Frontier.

The main foe of Cavalry Command and the Star Sheriffs is a race of non-human creatures known as Vapor Beings (also sometimes called Outriders) that have jumped into our dimension in order to conquer it. They attack the Settlers, destroy settlements, and kidnap humans in order to mine various metals or crystals from the soil of various planets.

Outriders are superior to humans in battle technology. They control a legion of gigantic robots ("Renegade Units") with weapons greatly superior to the weapons and defenses of the space-going fleets of Cavalry Command. In response to the Outriders's threat, Cavalry Command develops a prototype spaceship known as the "Ramrod Equalizer Unit" (or simply Ramrod) that has the ability to transform from a spaceship into a powerful robot that can fight the Outriders's  Renegade Units on equal terms.

Characters

Protagonists
 Saber Rider
Original name: Richard Lancelot
 The title character in the American version of the series, Saber Rider is the team's leader and captain of the Ramrod Equalizer Unit. He is occasionally referred to by the nickname "Top Sword." He is a young man, yet is described as having legendary sword skills and marksmanship. Saber Rider hails from the Scottish Highlands and is an expert with both swords and horses. He is generally depicted as being a gentleman with a cool head for tactics and decision-making. The American version retained the British Union Jack on the upper arm and the helmet design of Saber Rider's armored uniform; this helmet's design appears to incorporate a bearskin hat.

 Saber Rider often rides a robotic horse, responding to the name of "Steed," who has high–powered thrusters, and the ability to fly, run, and function in space. Steed is not capable of long–range space travel, so he is kept stored in Ramrod's cargo bay during journeys. He is used mainly to travel to planets from orbit, or utilized on a planet's surface. Steed has so sophisticated an artificial intelligence as almost to be sentient, as he is capable of recognizing his master's voice commands, and working independently when Saber Rider is in danger.

 Fireball Hikari
Original name: Shinji Hikari
 Shinji a.k.a. Fireball, a former race car driver, was the youngest driving champion in history. He now serves as the pilot of the Ramrod Equalizer Unit, and also has secondary control of the heavy weaponry located in Ramrod's chest region. He drives the "Red Fury Turbo Racer," a race car armed with an extensive arsenal of weapons. He has a somewhat quick temper, and at one time boasted of having a perfect memory. In the original Sei Jūshi Bismarck, Fireball is the Japanese leader of the crew. The Japanese flag is on his sleeve and his helmet.

 During the course of the series, he discovers that his father was a fighter pilot who fought alongside King Jaray of the Legendary Kingdom of Jarr when the Outriders first attacked fifteen years prior to the series's time frame. Sacrificing himself, Fireball's father sent his ship into Nemesis's command ship, robbing Nemesis of his body and sending them both into the Outrider dimension, where he remained lost as of the time frame of the series.

Coincidentally or not, Fireball's real name is strikingly similar to Shinji Ikari of Evangelion.

 Colt Willcox
Original name: William "Bill" Willcox
 Bill, also called Colt, is introduced in the series as a bounty hunter on the trail of Vanquo, an Outrider spy. Colt has an almost infallible accuracy with firearms and serves as the gunner on board Ramrod. His character is depicted as somewhat of a loner, but also as an outrageous flirt; he flirts with nearly every woman he meets. His parents were attacked and presumably killed by Outriders just after Colt left to join a traveling rodeo. This event prompted him to become a bounty hunter.

 For personal transportation and solo battles he uses a blue and white one-man spaceship he calls the "Bronco Buster." In Sei Jūshi Bismarck, the character comes from the United States, therefore a US flag is seen as a patch on his armored uniform; the design of the armor's helmet incorporates a simulation of a "ten-gallon hat."

 Commander Charles Eagle
Original name: Charles Louvre
 Commander Eagle is the leader of Cavalry Command, which includes all of the fleets and armies that protect the United Star Systems, including the Star Sheriffs. Charles takes his responsibilities seriously, but underneath has a warm heart and caring nature.

 April Eagle
Original name: Marianne Louvre
 April Eagle is the daughter of Commander Charles Eagle. She is the engineer who designed, and was in charge of, Project Ramrod. Before joining the Star Sheriffs, she was a professional tennis player. She was trained at Cavalry Command under General Whitehawk. April has a robotic horse, responding to the name of "Nova;" who has the abilities (and, presumably, the limitations) of Saber Rider's Steed.

 April is the subject of several romantic plot arcs. In early episodes of the series, April had an unrequited crush on Richard a.k.a. Saber Rider. In later episodes, Jesse Blue had an unrequited love interest in April. Finally, April and Shinji did begin a romantic relationship. Unlike most similar series, in Saber Rider and the Star Sheriffs the heroine does not end up in a romantic relationship with the main hero. This is because her eventual love interest, Shinji a.k.a. Fireball, was the hero in the original Japanese version.

 In the Japanese version, April is French, which is why her armored uniform bears the French tricolor.

 Ramrod
Original name: Bismark
 The Ramrod (voiced by Peter Cullen in imitation of John Wayne) was developed by April Eagle as the technological "miracle weapon" that would allow humans to counter the threat of the Outriders. Although it can be flown by one person, the ship is designed to be operated by four people, each sitting in separate units that control specific functions: navigation (April), weapons (Colt), pilot (Fireball) and the commander/tactician (Saber Rider).

 A highlight of nearly every episode is Ramrod's transformation from an airborne battleship into a giant fighting robot. When the Ramrod Equalizer Unit undergoes the "Challenge Phase" (usually activated by Fireball pressing a button in the center of his unit console), April calls out that Ramrod is taking over the navigational controls during the transformation. Ramrod acknowledges this while the 4 control units are shifted to new positions inside of Ramrod's head. As it completes the transformation it calls out its rallying cry in a heavy Western drawl, "Head 'em up, move 'em out...power stride, and ready to ride." The Ramrod vehicle will transform into a giant robot packing an over-sized six-shooter at the hip and appears to be wearing a cowboy hat and a cape. The battle conversion to robot form is used mainly when the Star Sheriffs encounter the Outriders' giant robots, which are known as either a Renegade or Desperado Unit. In "Maverick Quick-draw" mode, an array of assorted cannons will be deployed at Ramrod's chest, delivering the final blow to send an Outrider "Renegade Unit" back to the Vapor Zone. The Star Sheriffs sometimes refer to Ramrod's robot form as the "Big Sheriff."

 In the final episodes of the series, the original Ramrod was dismantled as part of a peace treaty brokered between the Outriders and Cavalry Command. However, when the Outriders broke the treaty by attempting to invade the New Frontier dimension, Cavalry Command issued the Star Sheriffs a more powerful version of Ramrod known as "Ramrod 2" with double the power of the original. Ramrod 2's Challenge Phase transformation was the same as the original Ramrod, only April now said "Ramrod 2 will now take navigational control."

 Ramrod was named Bismarck in the Japanese version, hence the series' name Sei Jūshi Bismarck. The Americanized name for the battleship possibly originates from a cowboy slang referring to the person-in-charge of an outfit, the leader of the pack, or the person who gets the job done.

 The Ramrod Equalizer Unit Challenge Phase is essentially the sequence in which Saber Rider And The Star Sheriffs becomes similar to a "monster-fighter (kaiju) series;" otherwise the series, in American form, is mainly Western-oriented.

Antagonists
The main antagonists are called the Outriders who are humanoids from the Vapor Zone, an alternate dimension. They do not require oxygen, but do require great quantities of water. They have the ability to disguise themselves as human beings, to the point where even a medical examination will not reveal their true identities.

Their personal existence is bleak, as is their home dimension. They have squandered all the resources on their home planet, forcing them to move to an artificial planet. The Outriders' goal is to conquer mankind and control the universe unhindered—they think the human dimension has much more to offer than their own. When an Outrider is shot or wounded, they do not die, but rather dimension jump, a process where they vanish and return to their home dimension.  After dimension jumping,  a wisp of poisonous, green gas, and a smudge where the Outrider stood remain. A self-initiated dimension jump leaves no trace at all.  Outriders who are shot or killed in the vapor dimension will turn to a human.  Under unique circumstances an Outrider, while in the human dimension, is in a situation that prevents them from making a dimension jump may also turn them to a human.

 Nemesis
Original name: Hyuza
 Nemesis, a huge, darkly clad, masked being, is the evil genius in charge of the renegade Outriders. He created the Vapor Trail that allows the Outriders to cross from their dimension into the human dimension. His primary motivation for ordering an invasion of the New Frontier is the unbearable boredom he feels in the Vapor Dimension. In the last episodes of the series it is revealed Nemesis is a cyborg, and his consciousness also existed as the Nth Degree, a powerful computer on the Outrider's artificial homeworld.

 Saber Rider is the only member of the Star Sheriffs to meet Nemesis one-on-one. In the episode "Stampede", the two faced each other in a laser sword duel after Saber crossed into the Vapor Zone in the wake of an Outrider ship travelling along the Vapor Trail. When Saber Rider was on the verge of winning the duel, Nemesis saved himself by emptying the oxygen from the chamber where they were fighting, rendering Saber Rider unconscious.

 Jesse Blue
Original name: Perios
 Jesse Blue is a man with odd traits; he has blue-green hair and a sarcastic streak. He was a promising cadet at Cavalry Command, until he fell in love with April Eagle during a training exercise. When April rejected his advances and inadvertently embarrassed him in front of the other cadets, he turned against the Star Sheriffs.

 Jesse cultivated a personal grudge against Saber Rider because he thought it was April's affection for Saber Rider that made her refuse his love. He planted a bomb aboard Ramrod, in an attempt to kill Saber Rider. When he learned April would be aboard at the time it would detonate, he panicked and confessed what he'd done to Saber. While it was too late to stop the bomb from exploding, Saber Rider was able to reach Ramrod in time to prevent the ship from being destroyed. Jesse Blue escaped and became a fugitive, turning his back on Cavalry Command and joining forces with the Outriders. He became obsessed with defeating the Star Sheriffs and conquering the New Frontier.

 Gattler
Original name: Zatora
 Gattler (occasionally referred to as Gattler the Rattler) wears a foreboding, fanged space mask. When his mask is removed, his form is revealed to be a glowering, dark villain. He is heavy-handed with a heart of stone, and answers only to Nemesis.

 Vanquo
 Vanquo is a ghostly Outrider with vacant eyes and a long pale face. He is a sinister character with a chilling laugh. Dressed in a serape and sombrero, he is an incredibly fast draw.

 Vanquo ultimately had a strange fate for an Outrider: he became human. He was confronted by Saber Rider in the Vapor Zone shortly after Saber Rider's duel with Nemesis in the episode "Stampede". Vanquo presented a rather piteous figure, abandoned by Nemesis and knowing he was defeated, he was at Saber Rider's mercy. Saber Rider reasoned that if he shot Vanquo inside the Vapor Zone, he would not be able to dimension jump and reform anew since he was already in his own dimension. This meant that shooting Vanquo would make him a solid being. Saber Rider consoled Vanquo by telling him he might like being a human. Afterwards, Vanquo looked down at his new human body and said, in somewhat teary happiness, "I think I might."

Music
The program's music score was composed by Dale Schacker, who was given complete artistic freedom in his composition of the whole score. The score features guitar based music in a fast, rhythmic, yet very fashionable Country Western style. Despite the fact that the music uses synthpop elements, its predominant instrument is the electric guitar rather than a synthesizer, creating a unique sound. Just like a Western movie score, the music is sometimes enriched by whip cracks, rattle snake, harmonica or similar Western sound effects. The music is also intentionally composed with a recurring musical theme, so that the show can be easily recognized, adding a sense of familiarity each time the show is viewed. Despite this aspect, the music does not sound repetitious, since only key elements of the composition are repeated. The opening and closing credits vocals were also sung by Schacker himself.

Two soundtrack compilations are available, each containing 2 CDs.
 Saber Rider and the Star Sheriffs – Soundtrack I
 Saber Rider and the Star Sheriffs – Soundtrack II

Other media

Video game
Saber Rider and the Star Sheriffs - The Game is an upcoming video game developed by a German group called "Team Saber Rider", under license from both World Events Productions and Studio Pierrot. The game was planned for multiple platforms, after a successful funding campaign on Kickstarter.

Originally announced in 2010, the game's development faced several problems, including the shuttering of the original developer Firehazard Studio. The head of development, Chris Strauss, originally worked on an earlier video game adaptation project, a 2D side-scrolling shooter initially planned for the Game Boy Advance, and later the Nintendo DS. However, the original game was then scrapped due to notions that more "casual" games sold better on the Nintendo DS.

Comic book
A comic miniseries based on the show was released on March 16, 2016. The four-issue miniseries is a reboot of the show's premise in order to appeal for a new generation. The miniseries is written by Mairghread Scott, and illustrated by Sendol Arts.

VHS UK history
Video Gems (Then: Little Gems) (1987–1991)

Cast list

Rob Paulsen – Saber Rider, Jesse Blue
Pat Fraley – Fireball
Townsend Coleman – Colt
Pat Musick – April Eagle
Peter Cullen – Narrator, Commander Eagle, Nemesis, Ramrod
B.J. Ward – Emily Wyeth, Sincia
Cam Clarke – Philip
Lennie Weinrib – Colonel Wyatt
Neil Ross – Buck, Grimmer
Tress MacNeille – Robin
Michael Bell – Snake Eyes

Episodes

Notes: An X indicates suggested viewing order of the six missing episodes in US dub and the five extra episodes in original Japanese version

Release
Ten episodes of Saber Rider and the Star Sheriffs were released in America on DVD by the U.S. rights-holders, World Events Productions. Several episodes were also released on VHS. At Otakon 2008, WEP announced that the entire series would be released on DVD through VCI Entertainment. The first of three DVD sets was released on November 18, 2008. The second DVD set was released on August 25, 2009. The complete Saber Rider and the Star Sheriffs DVD boxset was released on October 20, 2009.

In the UK, one DVD, titled Saber Rider and the Star Sheriffs – Volume 1, has been released by Anchor Bay Entertainment. Two additional DVDs have been released under their Kids Entertainment label. The entire series (46 of 51-original episodes + 6 extra episodes + 5 "Lost Episodes" of Bismark) has been released in German by Anime House on 10 DVDs. Special Editions of Volumes 5 and 10 featured a slipcase to hold 5 DVDs each. A limited-edition box featuring the complete series as well as three tin figures was also released. The entire Series is also released in standard definition on Blu-ray in Germany. The First Volume was released on July 25, 2014 and the second on September 26, 2014.

On July 11, 2016, the anime-focused television channel Toku began airing the series, and months later, it was added to its Amazon Prime channel.

On January 31, 2023, it was announced the series will be released on Blu-ray by Discotek Media.

References

External links
World Events Productions – Saber Rider and the Star Sheriffs
Studio Pierrot
Official Saber Rider video game site
 
 

1980s American science fiction television series
1980s Western (genre) television series
1987 American television series debuts
1987 anime television series debuts 
1988 American television series endings
Action anime and manga
Adventure anime and manga
American children's animated action television series
American children's animated space adventure television series
American children's animated science fantasy television series
American television series based on Japanese television series
Western (genre) animated television series
First-run syndicated television programs in the United States
Japanese science fiction television series
Nippon TV original programming
Space Western anime and manga
Space Western television series
Super robot anime and manga
Television series set in the future